William Frederick may refer to:
 Prince William Frederick, Duke of Gloucester and Edinburgh
 William Frederick, Prince of Nassau-Dietz
 William Frederick, Margrave of Brandenburg-Ansbach

See also